A learning cycle is a concept of how people learn from experience. A learning cycle will have a number of stages or phases, the last of which can be followed by the first.

John Dewey
In 1933, John Dewey described five phases or aspects of reflective thought:

Kurt Lewin
In the 1940s, Kurt Lewin developed action research and described a cycle of:
 Planning
 Action
 Fact finding, about the result of the action

Lewin particularly highlighted the need for fact finding, which he felt was missing from much of management and social work. He contrasted this to the military where

Kolb and Fry

In the early 1970s, David A. Kolb and Ronald E. Fry developed the experiential learning model (ELM), composed of four elements:
Concrete experience
Observation of and reflection on that experience
Formation of abstract concepts based upon the reflection
Testing the new concepts

Testing the new concepts gives concrete experience which can be observed and reflected upon, allowing the cycle to continue.

Kolb integrated this learning cycle with a theory of learning styles, wherein each style prefers two of the four parts of the cycle. The cycle is quadrisected by a horizontal and vertical axis. The vertical axis represents how knowledge can be grasped, through concrete experience or through abstract conceptualization, or by a combination of both. The horizontal axis represents how knowledge is transformed or constructed through reflective observation or active experimentation. These two axes form the four quadrants that can be seen as four stages: concrete experience (CE), reflective observation (RO), abstract conceptualization (AC) and active experimentation (AE) and as four styles of learning: diverging, assimilating, converging and accommodating.  The concept of learning styles has been criticised, see .

Honey and Mumford
In the 1980s, Peter Honey and Alan Mumford developed Kolb and Fry's ideas into slightly different learning cycle. The stages are:
 Doing something, having an experience
 Reflecting on the experience
 Concluding from the experience, developing a theory
 Planning the next steps, to apply or test the theory

While the cycle can be entered at any of the four stages, a cycle must be completed to give learning that will change behaviour. The cycle can be performed multiple times to build up layers of learning.

Honey and Mumford gave names (also called learning styles) to the people who prefer to enter the cycle at different stages: Activist, Reflector, Theorist and Pragmatist. Honey and Mumford's learning styles questionnaire has been criticized for poor reliability and validity.

5E
In the late 1980s, the 5E learning cycle was developed by Biological Sciences Curriculum Study, specifically for use in teaching science. The learning cycle has four phases:
 Engage, in which a student's interest is captured and the topic is established.
 Explore, in which the student is allowed to construct knowledge in the topic through facilitated questioning and observation.
 Explain, in which students are asked to explain what they have discovered, and the instructor leads a discussion of the topic to refine the students' understanding.
 Extend, in which students are asked to apply what they have learned in different but similar situations, and the instructor guides the students toward the next discussion topic.

The fifth E stands for Evaluate, in which the instructor observes each student's knowledge and understanding, and leads students to assess whether what they have learned is true. Evaluation should take place throughout the cycle, not within its own set phase.

Alistair Smith
The phases are:
Create the supportive learning environment – safe but stimulating
Connect the learning – useful knowledge we already have
Give the big picture
Describe the learning outcomes we want to achieve
Input – new information to enable the activity
Activity
Demonstrate the findings of the activity
Review for recall and retention

Unlike other learning cycles, step 8 is normally followed by step 2, rather than step 1.

ALACT
In the 2000s, Fred Korthagen and Angelo Vasalos (and others) developed the ALACT model, specifically for use in personal development. The five phases of the ALACT cycle are:
Action
Looking back on the action
Aspects of essential awareness
Creating alternative methods of action
Trial

As with Kolb and Fry, trial is an action that can be looked back on. Korthagen and Vasalos listed coaching interventions for each phase and described "levels of reflection" inspired by Gregory Bateson's hierarchy of logical types. In 2010, they connected their model of reflective learning to the practice of mindfulness and to Otto Scharmer's Theory U, which, in contrast to a learning cycle, emphasizes reflecting on a desired future rather than on past experience.

See also

 
 
 
 
 
 
 
 Improvement cycle

References

Learning
Stage theories